The Progressive Era was a newspaper for the African-American community published in Athens, Georgia. It was established in 1899. The Library of Congress has a collection of the paper on microfilm.  It was purchased by Monroe Morton in 1914 from W. D. Johnson, A. M. E. Bishop, and W. H. Harris, a dentist whose office was in the Morton Building. Morton served as editor and publisher. No known editions from his tenure have survived.

References

Defunct newspapers published in Georgia (U.S. state)
Defunct African-American newspapers
1899 establishments in Georgia (U.S. state)
Companies based in Athens, Georgia